Harriet Archer Scott (born 10 February 1993) is a professional footballer who plays as a defender for Birmingham City and the Republic of Ireland national team. She was named Women's International Player of the Year by the Football Association of Ireland in 2018. A combative left-back, Scott joined Reading at youth level and remained with the Berkshire club when they were promoted into the FA Women's Super League in 2015.

Club career
Scott joined her local club Reading as an eight-year-old and progressed through the club's youth system to debut in the first team as a 16-year-old. She spent some time out of football due to her studies, before returning to Reading and helping them secure promotion to the top-flight FA Women's Super League in 2015.

Scott signed a full-time professional contract with Reading in January 2016. She made seven appearances during the 2016 FA WSL season. Reading finished in eighth place with a  record. After signing a new contract with Reading for the 2017 FA WSL season, Scott made eight appearances during the regular season. The team finished in sixth place with a  record.

After leaving Reading, Scott agreed to join Birmingham City ahead of the 2018–19 FA WSL season. In her first season she was an important player for The Blues as they performed better than expected, compiling a  record to finish fourth in the League. She signed a new two-year contract with Birmingham in July 2019. Following the departure of the long-serving Kerys Harrop in 2020, Scott was appointed club captain by incoming Birmingham manager Carla Ward.

International career

Youth
In 2010, Scott was included in the Republic of Ireland U-17 squad who were runners-up in the 2010 UEFA Women's Under-17 Championship and quarter-finalists in the 2010 FIFA U-17 Women's World Cup. Scott was born in England but eligible to play football for Ireland because three of her four grandparents were Irish. After refusing an under-19 call up in order to prioritise her educational commitments, Scott spent an extended period out of consideration at international level.

Senior
Scott made her debut for the Republic of Ireland women's national football team at the 2017 Cyprus Cup in a 2–0 win over Czech Republic. She became an important national team player under head coach Colin Bell, displaying good form in the unsuccessful 2019 FIFA Women's World Cup qualifying series.

Honours

Club
 Reading
 FAWSL 2: 2015

National
Individual
 Women's International Player of the Year: 2018

Personal life
During the 2020–21 FA WSL season, Scott entered her final year of studying medicine at Keele University. She is a qualified and chartered physiotherapist, and left her full-time position at Royal Berkshire Hospital to become a professional footballer, although she continued to work at the Hospital part-time. During the hiatus in her playing career with Reading, Scott moved to Bristol, attended the University of West England and worked as a physiotherapist for the Wales women's national football team under head coach Jayne Ludlow.

References

External links
 
 
 
 Harriet Scott at Football Association of Ireland (FAI)
 

1993 births
Living people
Reading F.C. Women players
Republic of Ireland women's international footballers
Republic of Ireland women's association footballers
Women's Super League players
Women's association football defenders
Birmingham City W.F.C. players
Sportspeople from Reading, Berkshire
English people of Irish descent
Women's Championship (England) players
FA Women's National League players
Alumni of the University of the West of England, Bristol
Physiotherapists
Footballers from Berkshire
Republic of Ireland women's youth international footballers